was a Kikuchi retainer, lord of Higo-Nagano Castle. He later served the Ryūzōji. He was defeated during Hideyoshi Toyotomi's conquest of Kyūshū. He died in the Higo riots.

1516 births
1588 deaths
Samurai